Shouzhou or Shou Prefecture was a zhou (prefecture) in imperial China centering on modern Shou County, Anhui, China. It existed (intermittently) from 589 to 1912.

Geography
The administrative region of Shouzhou in the Tang dynasty falls within the administration of modern Lu'an, Anhui. It probably includes parts of modern: 
 Shou County
 Lu'an: Yu'an District, Jin'an District
 Huoshan County
 Huoqiu County

In 956, the Later Zhou state moved the headquarter from modern Shou County further north to modern Fengtai County (now under the administration of Huainan, Anhui).

References
 

Prefectures of the Sui dynasty
Prefectures of the Tang dynasty
Prefectures of the Song dynasty
Prefectures of Later Zhou
Prefectures of Southern Tang
Prefectures of Yang Wu
Prefectures of the Ming dynasty
Prefectures of the Qing dynasty
Prefectures of the Jin dynasty (1115–1234)
Former prefectures in Anhui